The Royal Consorts of Albania were the spouses of the Albanian Monarchs. They used the titles Queen of the Albanians, Queen of Albania, Princess of Albania, Lady of the Kingdom of Albania, etc.

Notes

See also
List of consorts of Naples
List of consorts of Sicily
Despoina and Empresses of Epirus

 
Albania, Queen Consorts of
Albania, Queen Consorts of
Consorts
Albanian
Consorts